Hypocalymma is a genus of evergreen shrubs in the myrtle family Myrtaceae described as a genus in 1840. The entire genus is endemic to southern Western Australia.

Species list
The following is a list of formally described Hypocalymma species and subspecies accepted by the Australian Plant Census as at August 2020:

 Hypocalymma angustifolium (Endl.) Schauer  white myrtle
 Hypocalymma angustifolium (Endl.) Schauer  subsp. angustifolium
 Hypocalymma asperum Schauer
 Hypocalymma connatum Strid & Keighery
 Hypocalymma cordifolium Lehm. ex Schauer 
 Hypocalymma elongatum (Strid & Keighery) Rye
 Hypocalymma ericifolium Benth. 
 Hypocalymma gardneri Strid & Keighery
 Hypocalymma hirsutum Strid & Keighery 
 Hypocalymma jessicae Strid & Keighery
 Hypocalymma linifolium Turcz. 
 Hypocalymma longifolium F.Muell.
 Hypocalymma melaleucoides Gardner ex Strid & Keighery
 Hypocalymma minus (Strid & Keighery) Keighery
 Hypocalymma myrtifolium Turcz.
 Hypocalymma phillipsii Harv.
 Hypocalymma puniceum C.A.Gardner large myrtle 
 Hypocalymma robustum (Endl.) Lindl. Swan River myrtle 
 Hypocalymma scariosum Schauer
 Hypocalymma serrulatum Strid & Keighery 
 Hypocalymma speciosum Turcz.
 Hypocalymma strictum Schauer 
 Hypocalymma sylvestre Strid & Keighery 
 Hypocalymma tenuatum Strid & Keighery
 Hypocalymma tetrapterum Turcz.
 Hypocalymma uncinatum Strid & Keighery
 Hypocalymma verticillare Rye
 Hypocalymma xanthopetalum F.Muell.

References

External links

FloraBase – The Western Australian Flora: Hypocalymma
Association of Societies for Growing Australian Plants - Hypocalymma

 
Myrtaceae genera
Endemic flora of Southwest Australia
Taxa named by Stephan Endlicher